Rosborough is the surname of the following people
Henry Rosborough Swanzy (1843–1913), Irish ophthalmic surgeon
Jim Rosborough (born 1944), American basketball coach
Patty Rosborough, American stand-up comedian
Samuel Rosborough Balcom (1888–1981), Canadian politician

See also
Roxborough (disambiguation)